Kruti Parekh (born 1984) is India's first test-tube baby at birth 
, and has been a professional magician since early childhood. Currently, she works as a motivational speaker for corporates.

Accolades
As a child magician, Parekh has been featured several times on Doordarshan, India's national television channel.

At the age of 11, she received the FIE Foundation National Award. In 1999, she was awarded the Global 500 Roll of Honour, by the United Nations Environment Programme. 

She has received many national and international accolades including the "Yuva Ojaswini Award", an Indian national level award, and the Young Achievers Award by American Consulate. In 2002, she was selected  as a Jury Member for the Children's Nobel Prize. She attended the World Youth Peace Summit - Asia Pacific in Bangkok, Thailand 2004 as a youth leader for peace. Her story has appeared in a book about normal kids doing heroic deeds published by Free Spirit Publishers, U.S.A. under the title of Kids Using Talent & Creativity. Her story was chosen amongst 30 Stories around the world.

Education
Kruti Parekh has completed her Engineering in Information and Technology with Distinction.

Current Activities
Parekh is a lecturer of Degree Engineering at the D.J. Sanghvi College of Engineering & NMIMS University, Mumbai. She runs the "Kruti's Magic Academy" where she trains young aspirants to become magicians. She is the only magician who has a course on magic running at the Mumbai University. She conducts Mind Power workshops for corporate houses and institutions and has also written a book "Beyond the Threshold of Mind".

References

1984 births
Living people
In vitro fertilisation